Metorchis is a genus of flatworms belonging to the family Opisthorchiidae.

The species of this genus are found in Europe, Asia, Northern America.

Species:

Metorchis bilis 
Metorchis butoridi 
Metorchis caintaensis 
Metorchis coeruleus 
Metorchis conjunctus 
Metorchis elegans 
Metorchis elongata 
Metorchis felis 
Metorchis grusi 
Metorchis hovorkai 
Metorchis neomidis 
Metorchis nettioni 
Metorchis oesophagolongus 
Metorchis orientalis 
Metorchis taiwanensis 
Metorchis tener 
Metorchis xanthosomus 
Metorchis xanthostomus 
Metorchis zacharovi

References

Platyhelminthes